The Snaffling Pig Co is the trading name of Snaffling Pig Limited, a British snack food manufacturer. Snaffling Pig is known for its own brand of pork snack products.

The company appeared on the 14th season of BBC Two's Dragons’ Den in 2016, where it gained a £70,000 investment from Nick Jenkins.

History 
The Snaffling Pig Co started as the Giggling Pig Limited in December 2013, when its founder, Nick Coleman, challenged Udhi Silva to a bet: the first person to grow a company to £1m sales revenue on just £500 seed investment would be treated to a steak dinner.

Initially, Snaffling Pig's sales were slow. According to the Snaffling Pig website, the sales accelerated when a publicity stunt in 2016 – the world's first pork scratching advent calendar – attracted over 10,000 orders.

In 2016, the company appeared on series 14 of Dragons’ Den, where it gained a £70,000 investment from ‘dragon’ Nick Jenkins.

In 2017, The Snaffling Pig Co won the Virgin 'Foodpreneur' award, with the prize a six-week retail space at the Lakeside Shopping Centre.

In 2018, The Snaffling Pig was a finalist for the Consumer Business of the year - Start Ups Awards.

In 2019, The Snaffling Pig Co surpassed its initial £750,000 funding target on equity crowdfunding platform Crowdcube and raised over £1.1 million with investment from over 1,800 investors, known as The Snaffling Pig Co's ‘Swine Diners’.

In April 2021, The Snaffling Pig Co was listed as the UK's second largest pork snacks brand, with YOY growth of 26%.

In May 2021, Snaffling Pig worked with creative agency Creative AF to produce a soundtrack for the brand, based on their motto: Piggin' Magic.

In February 2022, Snaffling Pig recalled a specific batch of 45 Gms Perfectly Salted Pork Scratchings because of the presence of Salmonella.

Great Taste Awards 
The Guild of Fine Food has awarded The Snaffling Pig Co a total of 12 Great Taste Awards across its snack ranges. Award-winning pork crackling and scratchings flavours include Black Pepper, Low & Slow BBQ, Hot to Trot Habanero, Marvelous Maple, Perfectly Salted, and Salt 'N' Vinegar. In 2021, Snaffling Pig won the Great Taste Awards for its Chorizo Bites and Caramelised Honey & Chilli Peanuts.

Pork crackling advent calendar 
In 2017, The Snaffling Pig Co launched its first pork scratchings advent calendar in Debenhams. The advent calendar contains 24 bags of 6 different flavors of pork crackling, and through advent calendar sales alone, The Snaffling Pig Co sells 2.1 million packets of crackling annually.

There are three pork crackling advent calendars in their advent range, including: just a pork snacks calendar, a beer and pork advent calendar, and a seven-day, new year countdown calendar called, ‘Auld Lang Swine’.

References 

Snack food manufacturers of the United Kingdom
British companies established in 2015